(Main list of acronyms)


 p – (s) pico
 P – (s) Peta – Phosphorus

P0–9
 P2P – (i) Peer-to-peer (networking)
 P3I or P3I – (i) PrePlanned Product Improvement

PA
 pa – (s) Punjabi language (ISO 639-1 code)
 pA – (s) picoampere
 Pa
 (s) pascal
 Protactinium
 PA
 (a/i) Pamela Anderson
 (s) Panama (ISO 3166 digram)
 Paraguay (FIPS 10-4 country code)
 (i) Partial Agonist
 (s) Pennsylvania (postal symbol)
 petampere
 (i) PolyAmide (Nylon)
 Prince Albert piercing
 Public Address (vocal amplification system)
 Public Affairs
 PA 6 – (s) Nylon 6 (PolyAmide) (similarly for PA 11, 12, 46, 66, 610)
 PAA – (i) Position Area for Artillery
 PAB – (s) Panamanian balboa (ISO 4217 currency code)
 PABX – (p) Private Automated Branch eXchange (company phone system)
 PAC
 (i) Pan Africanist Congress
 (a) Partial Solar Calibrator
 Patriot Advanced Capabilities
 Political action committee
 (a/i) Primary Auditory Cortex
 PACER – (a) Public Access to Court Electronic Records (U.S. federal courts)
 PACOM – (p) (U.S.) Pacific Command
 PADD
 (a) Personal Access Display Device (as seen in the Star Trek franchise)
 Petroleum Administration for Defense Districts, used for data collection in the U.S. petroleum industry 
 PADI – (a) Professional Association of Diving Instructors
 PAEK – (i) PolyArylEtherKetone
 PAFC – (i) Plymouth Argyle Football Club
 PAH – (i) Polycyclic aromatic hydrocarbon
 PAHO – (i) Pan American Health Organization
 PAI
 (i) PolyAmide Imide
 Pre-Approval Inspection (pharma)
 PAK – (s) Pakistan (ISO 3166 trigram)
 Pakistan – (p) Punjab, Afghan states, Kashmir, sIndh, baluchiSTAN
 PAL
 (a) Phase Alternating Line (TV standard)
 (p) Philippine Airlines
 PAM – (a/i) Precision Attack Missile
 Pamida – (p) Patrick, Michael, and David, sons of the department store chain's co-founder Jim Witherspoon
 PAMELA
 (a) Payload for Antimatter Matter Exploration and Light-nuclei Astrophysics
 (a) Pedestrian Accessibility and Movement Environment Laboratory
 pan – (s) Punjabi language (ISO 639-2 code)
 PAN
 (s) Panama (ISO 3166 trigram)
 (a) Partai Amanat Nasional (Indonesian, "National Mandate Party") – Indonesian political party
 Partido Acción Nacional (Spanish, "National Action Party") – political parties in El Salvador, Mexico, and Nicaragua 
 Partido de Avanzada Nacional (Spanish, "National Advancement Party") – Guatemalan political party
 Personal area network
 (i) PolyAcryloNitrile
 (a) Programa de Asistencia Nutricional (Spanish, "Nutritional Assistance Program") – U.S. federal program for nutritional needs of poor families in Puerto Rico
 PANS – (a) Pretty Advanced/Awesome Network Services (cf. POTS)
 Pan-STARRS – (p) Panoramic Survey Telescope And Rapid Response System
 PAO
 (i) Panathinaikos Athlitikos Omilos (Greek: Παναθηναϊκός Αθλητικός Όμιλος, "Pan-Athenian Athletic Club")
 Public Affairs Officer
 PAOK – (i) Panthessalonikeios Athlitikós Ómilos Konstantinoupoliton (Greek Πανθεσσαλονίκειος Αθλητικός Όμιλος Κωνσταντινοπολιτών, "Pan-Thessalonian Athletic Club of Constantinopolites")
 PAP – (i) People's Action Party (Singapore)
 PAPI – (a) Precision Approach Path Indicator (aviation)
 PAR – (s) Paraguay (IOC and FIFA trigram, but not ISO 3166)
 PARC – (a) Palo Alto Research Center
 PAROS – (a) Prevention of an Arms Race in Outer Space (treaty)
 PARP – (i) (NATO Partnership for Peace) Planning And Review Process
 PARWIG – (a) Power Augmented Ram Wing In Ground (aeroplane wing shape)
 PAS – See entry
 PASA – (i) PolyAmide, Semi-Aromatic (Nylon)
 PASGT – (i) Personnel Armor System, Ground Troops
 PASR – (i) Personnel Accounting and Strength Reporting
 PatD - (s) Panic! at the Disco
 PATH – (a) Port Authority Trans-Hudson
 PAWS
 (a) Phased Array Warning System
 Progressive Animal Welfare Society
 PAYD – (a) Pay As You Drive
 PAYE – (a) Pay As You Earn

PB
 Pb – (s) Lead (Latin Plumbum)
 PB – (p) PolyButylene
 PBA
 (i) Philippine Basketball Association
 Professional Bowlers Association
 PBB – (p) PolyBrominated Biphenyl
 PBCK – (i) Problem Between Chair and Keyboard (computer help desk in-joke)
 PBD – (p) PolyButaDiene
 PBDE – (i) PolyBrominated Diphenyl Ether
 PBI – (p) PolyBenzImidazole
 PBIS - Positive Behavior Interventions and Supports
 PBN – (p) PolyButylene Naphthalate
 PBOH – (i) Please Become Old History
 PBR
 (i) Pabst Blue Ribbon (beer brand)
 Professional Bull Riders
 PBS
 (i) Pharmaceutical Benefits Scheme (Australia)
 Public Broadcasting Service (U.S.)
 Public Broadcasting Services (Malta)
PBRT - may stand for: Physically Based Raytracing, an open source software rendering system for physically correct image synthesis.
 PBT – (p) PolyButylene Terephthalate
 PBX – (p) Private Branch eXchange (company phone system)

PC
 pC – (s) picocoulomb
 PC
 (s) petacoulomb
 U.S. Pacific Islands Trust Territory (ISO 3166 digram; obsolete 1986)
 (i) Personal computer
 Player Character (roleplaying)
 Politically Correct / Political Correctness
 post cibum (Latin, "after meals")
 PCAS – (i) Planet-Crossing Asteroid Survey
 PCB – see entry
 PCC
 (i) NATO Partnership Coordination Cell
 Posterior Cingulate Cortex
 Pre-Command Course
 Presidents Conference Committee
 PCCB – (i) Porsche Ceramic Composite Brake
 PCCIP – (i) President's Commission on Critical Infrastructure Protection
 PCE – (p) PerChlorEthylene
 PCI
 (s) U.S. Pacific Islands Trust Territory (ISO 3166 trigram; obsolete 1986)
 (i) Peripheral Component Interconnect (computer bus)
 PCIe – (i) Peripheral Component Interconnect Express (computer bus)
 PCL – (i) Passive Coherent Location
 PCMCIA – (i) Personal Computer Memory Card International Association (People Can't Memorise Computer-Industry Acronyms)
 PCN – (s) Pitcairn Islands (ISO 3166 trigram)
 PCP
 (p) phencyclidine
 Pneumocystis jiroveci pneumonia (formerly Pneumocystis carinii)
 (i) Probabilistically Checkable Proof
 PCPI – Physician Consortium for Performance Improvement (AMA)
 PCR – (i) Polymerase chain reaction
 PCSSD - (p) Pulaski County Special School District
 PCT
 (i) Pacific Crest Trail
 Patent Cooperation Treaty
 PCTE
 (i) Portable Common Tool Environment
 (i) Punjab College of Technical Education
 PCZ – (s) Panama Canal Zone (ISO 3166 trigram; obsolete 1980)

PD
 Pd – (s) Palladium
 PD
 (i) per diem (Latin: (calculated) by the day)
 Point of Departure
 Police Department
 Postal District
 Potential Difference
 Principal Deputy
 Privatdozent
 Public domain
 PD – (i) Product Director—Example: CERDEC Product Director C4ISR and Network Modernization
 PDA
 (i) Personal Digital Assistant
 Predicted Drift Angle
 Public Display of Affection
 Push-Down Automaton
 PDD
 (i) Past Due Date
 Presidential Decision Directive
 PDF
 (i) Panama[nian] Defense Forces (abolished 1990)
 Portable Document Format
 Principal Direction of Fire
 PDG
 (i) President Director General
 Product Development Group
 PDL
 (i) Premier Development League, a former name of the U.S. minor soccer league now known as USL League Two
 Pure Dumb Luck (Texan punk band)
 PDN – (i) Pull-Down Network
 PDP
 (i) Programmable Data Processor
 Performance Development Plan
 PDQ
 (i) Pre-Defined Queries (Siebel packages)
 Pretty Damn Quick
 PDRY – (i) People's Democratic Republic of Yemen (obsolete since 1990)
 PDT – (i) Pacific Daylight [Saving] Time (UTC-7 hours)
 PDU
 (i) Police Dog Unit
 Power Distribution Unit
 Protocol Data Unit
 PDVSA – (a/i) Petróleos de Venezuela, S.A. (Spanish, "Venezuelan Petroleum Company")

PE
 PE – Professional Engineer
 PE – (s) Ice Pellets (old style METAR Code) – Peru (ISO 3166 and FIPS 10-4 country code digram) – (i) Physical Education – Premature Ejaculation – (s) Prince Edward Island (postal code) – Price to Earning ratio (used for equity shares) – Plant Extract
 PEBCAC – (a) Problem Exists Between Chair and Computer (IT help desk in-joke)
 PEBKAC – (a) Problem Exists Between Keyboard and Chair (ditto)
 PEEK – (i) PolyEtherEtherKetone
 PEET – (a) Partnerships for Enhancing Expertise in Taxonomy
 PEGIDA – (a) Patriotische Europäer gegen die Islamisierung des Abendlandes (German, "Patriotic Europeans Against the Islamization of the West")
 PEI – (i) Prince Edward Island – PolyEtherImide
 PEK – (i) PolyEtherKetone
 PEMDAS - The order of operations in math (Parentheses, Exponents, Division, Multiplication, Addition, Subtraction)
 PEN
 (s) Peruvian sol (ISO 4217 currency code)
 (i) Poets, Essayists and Novelists, the original meaning of the initialism of the organization now known as PEN International
 PolyEthylene Naphthalate
 PEO – (i) Παγκύπρια Εργατική Ομοσπονδία (Greek for "Pancyprian Federation of Labour") –  Philanthropic Educational Organization – PolyEthylene Oxide – Professional Employer Organization – Professional Engineers Ontario
 PEPFAR – (a) President's Emergency Plan For AIDS Relief
 PER – (s) Peru (ISO 3166 trigram)
 perl – (a) usually lower case Practical Extraction and Report Language
 PERM - Program Electronic Review Management
 PES – (i) PolyEtherSulfone
 PEST – (a) UK Public Engagement with Science and Technology
 PET – (a/i) Personal Electronic Transactor –  Pierre Elliott Trudeau – Positron Emission Tomography (as in PET scan) – PolyEthylene Terephthalate (plastic) – (a) Preliminary English Test
 PETA – (a/i) pentaerythritol triacrylate – People Eating Tasty Animals – People for the Ethical Treatment of Animals
 PETE – (i) PolyEthyleneTErephthalate
 PETP – (i) PolyEthyleneTerePhthalate

PF
 pF – (s) picofarad
 PF
 (s) French Polynesia (ISO 3166 digram)
 petafarad
 (i) Phenol Formaldehyde (resin)
 Power forward, a player position in Australian rules football, basketball, and ice hockey
 PFD – (i) Permanent Fund Dividend = personal flotation device
 PFE – (i) Permanent Forest Estate
 PFLAG – (p) Parents, Families and Friends of Lesbians and Gays ("pee-flag")
 PFIY – (a) Please Fix it Yourself ("pee-fiy")
 PFO – (i) Pissed, Fell Over (medical diagnosis in-joke)
 PfP – (i) Partnership for Peace
 PFW
 (i) Pro Football Weekly (magazine and website covering the National Football League)
 Purdue University Fort Wayne

PG
 pg – (s) picogram
 Pg – (s) petagram
 PG –  
 (i) propylene glycol
 (s) Papua New Guinea (ISO 3166 digram)
 (i) Parental Guidance (movie rating)
 Point guard (basketball position)
 PG-13 (disambiguation) – (p) (movie rating)
 PGCE – (p) Postgraduate Certificate in Education
 PGD – (i) Pre-implantation Genetic Diagnosis
 PG&E – (i) Pacific Gas & Electric
 PGENI – (i) Pharmaco-Genetics for Every Nation Initiative
 PGH – (i) Pre-implantation Genetic Haplotyping
 PGK – (s) Papua New Guinea kina (ISO 4217 currency code)
 PGM – (i) Precision-Guided Munition
 PGP – (i) Pretty Good Privacy

PH
 pH
 (s) parts of hydrogen (acidity/alkalinity index)
 picohenry
 PH
 (i) Passive Homing (missile guidance system)
 (s) petahenry
 Philippines (ISO 3166 digram)
 (i) Probability of Hit
 Professional hunter (abbreviation used mostly in East and Southern Africa)
 Public Health
 Purple Heart
 (i) Pakatan Harapan (Malaysia)
 PHA
 (p) PolyHydroxyAlkanoate
 (i) Potentially hazardous asteroid
 Ph.D. – (p) Philosophiæ Doctor (Latin, "Doctor of Philosophy")
 PHEV – (i) Plug-in hybrid electric vehicle
 PHF
 (i) Paired helical filaments (aggregations of tau proteins in the human brain associated with tauopathy)
 Potentially Hazardous Food
 Premier Hockey Federation (North American women's ice hockey league)
 PHL – (s) Philippines (ISO 3166 trigram)
 PHQ - Patient Health Questionnaire
 PHP
 (s) Philippine peso (ISO 4217 currency code)
 (i) PHP: Hypertext Preprocessor (originally Personal Home Page (Tools))

PI
 pi – (s) Pāli language (ISO 639-1 code)
 Pi – (s) Pebi
 PI – (i) PolyImide – PolyIsoprene – Private Investigator
 PIB – (i) PolyIsoButylene
 PIC – (i) Person In Charge
 PICNIC – (a) Problem In Chair Not In Computer
 PICS – (i) Private Investment Capital Subscription
 PID – (i) Pelvic Inflammatory Disease – (p) Plan Identification Number – Positive Identification – Procedural Identification – (i) Procurement Identification Description
PIDOOMA – (a/i) Pulled It Directly Out Of My Ass
 PIF – (a/i) Partners in Flight
 PIG – (a) Pipeline Inspection Gauge
 PIGS (also PIIGS or PIIGGS) – (a) Portugal, Italy, Greece, Spain; PIIGS if including Ireland; PIIGGS if including the United Kingdom (Great Britain)
 PIGS – Passenger Inert Guidance Systems – Movable tape barrier, typically used on airport aprons to guide passengers to/from their aircraft avoiding danger areas.
 PIM – (a/i) Parameterized Ionospheric Model – Path of Intended Motion – Pediatric Index of Mortality – Personal Information Manager/Management –  Presence and Interworking Mobility – Processor-In-Memory – Program Integration Manager – Protocol Independent Multicast
 PIN – (a) Personal Identification Number
 PINF – (i) People In Need Foundation (Czech charitable organisation)
 PIPA – (a/i) Program on International Policy Attitudes
 PIR – (i) Priority Intelligence Requirement
 PIRA – (a) Provisional Irish Republican Army
 PIREPS – (p) Pilot Reports
 PITA – (a) Pain In The Ass
 P.I. - Philippines Islands
 PITS - Person In The Seat. A common problem as to why a computer is not working properly. It is a PITS issue.

PJ
 pJ – (s) picojoule
 PJ – (s) petajoule
 PJHQ – (p) Permanent Joint Headquarters
 PJs – (p) Pajamas ("pee-jayz")

PK
 K – (s) picokelvin
 PK – (s) Pakistan (ISO 3166 and FIPS 10-4 country code digram) – petakelvin –  (i) Player Kill[er] – Probability of Kill – (p) PolyKetone – (i) Pulemet Kalashnikova (Russian ПК пулемет Калашникова, "Machinegun Kalashnikov")
 PKA – (i) previously known as – professionally known as
 PKE – (i) Partnership of Kindermusik Educators
 PKI – (i) public key infrastructure (cryptography)
 PKM – (i) Pulemet Kalashnikova Modernizirovanniy (Russian ПКМ пулемет Калашникова модернизированный, "Machinegun Kalashnikov Modernised")
 PKMS – (i) Pulemet Kalashnikova Modernizirovanniy Stepanova (Russian ПКМС пулемет Калашникова модернизированный Степанова, "Machinegun Kalashnikov Modernised Stepanova")
 PKMT – (i) Pulemet Kalashnikova Modernizirovanniy Tankoviy (Russian ПКМТ пулемет Калашникова модернизированный танковый, "Machinegun Kalashnikov Modernised Tank") (a.k.a. PKTM)
 PKR 
 (s) Pakistani rupee (ISO 4217 currency code)
 (i) People's Justice Party (Malaysia)
 PKT – (i) Pulemet Kalashnikova Tankoviy (Russian ПКТ пулемет Калашникова танковый, "Machinegun Kalashnikov Tank")
 PKTM – (i) Pulemet Kalashnikova Tankoviy Modernizirovanniy (Russian ПКТМ пулемет Калашникова танковый модернизированный, "Machinegun Kalashnikov Tank Modernised") (a.k.a. PKMT)
 PKU – (p) Phenylketonuria

PL
 pl – (s) Polish language (ISO 639-1 code)
 pL – (s) picolitre
 PL
 (s) Ice Pellets (new style METAR Code)
 (s) petalitre
 (i) Phase Line (Co-ordination Line)
 (s) Poland (ISO 3166 and FIPS 10-4 country code digram)
 PLA
 (i) People's Liberation Army (Chinese military forces)
 Programmable logic array
 PLAF
 (a/i) People's Liberation Armed Forces
 Pluggable look and feel
 Product Line Architecture Framework
 PLAID – (p) Precision Location and Identification
 PLB – (i) Personal Locator Beacon
 PLC – (i) Public Limited Company (British)
 PLCC – (i) Plastic Leaded Chip Carrier (electronics)
 PLD – (i) Probable Line of Deployment
 PLEBS – (i) People Lacking Everyday Basic Skills
 PLF – (i) Parachute Landing Fall
 PLGR – (a) Precision Lightweight GPS Receiver ("plugger")
 pli – (s) Pāli language (ISO 639-2 code)
 PLI
 (i) Position Location Information
 Practising Law Institute
 Private Lands Initiative
 Professional Liability Insurance
 PLIF – (a) Planar Laser-Induced Fluorescence
 PLK – (i) Polska Liga Koszykówki (Polish, "Polish Basketball League")
 PLKK – (i) Polska Liga Koszykówki Kobiet (Polish, "Polish Women's Basketball League"), former name of the league now known as Basket Liga Kobiet
 PLL
 (i) Phase-Locked Loop (electronics)
 Premier Lacrosse League
 PLM – (i) Polarized Light Microscope/Microscopy
 PLMBA  - (i)  Phospholipid Bilayer Microarray
 Pln – (p) Platoon
 PLN – (s) Polish zloty (ISO 4217 currency code)
 PLO – (i) Palestine Liberation Organization
 PLOKTA – (a) Press Lots Of Keys To Abort
 PLP – (i) Platonic Life Partner
 PLS
 (i) Palletized Loading System
 Personal Locator System
 PLUTO – (a) Pipe Line Under The Ocean
 PLW – (s) Palau (ISO 3166 trigram)

PM
 pm – (s) picometre
 Pm – (s) petametre – Promethium
 PM – (s) Panama (FIPS 10-4 country code) – (i) Perry Mason – Phase Modulation –  Post Meridiem (Latin "after noon") – Prime Minister – Project Manager – (s) Saint Pierre and Miquelon (ISO 3166 digram)
 PMC – (i) Primary Motor Cortex
 PMCS – (i) Partial Mission Capable Supply (SM&R code) – Power Management Control System – Professional Military Comptroller School
 PME – (i) Professional Military Education
 PMHT – (i) Pardon My Hashtag (Also #PMHT)
 PMI – (i) Positive Material Identification
 PMID – (p) PubMed Identifier
 PMMA – (i) PolyMethylMethAcrylate
 PMOS – (i/a) P-type/Positive Metal-Oxide-Semiconductor transistor ("pee-moss")
 PMS – (i) Premenstrual Syndrome
 PMSC – (i) NATO Political-Military Steering Committee on Partnership for Peace
 PMSL – (i) Piss Myself Laughing (Internet shorthand)
 PMT - Premenstrual Tension (UK) (see Premenstrual Syndrome)

PN
 pN – (s) piconewton
 PN
 (s) petanewton
 Pitcairn Islands (ISO 3166 diagram)
 (i) Perikatan Nasional (Malaysia)
 PNAC – (i) Project for the New American Century
 PNC
 (i) Palestinian National Council
 Palmerston North City (cf. PNC, a New Zealand rapper from this city)
 Parti nationaliste chrétien, defunct Quebec political party
 Pittsburgh National Corporation, one of the two companies that merged into today's PNC Financial Services
 Provident National Corporation, the other company that merged into PNC Financial Services
 PNF – (i) Pilot Not Flying (aviation)
 PNG
 (s) Papua New Guinea (ISO 3166 trigram)
 (i) Portable Network Graphics
 PNP
 Parti national populaire, defunct Quebec political party 
 (i) Partido Nuevo Progresista
 Plug 'N' Play/Pray
 Positive Negative Positive
 PNS – (s) Pensacola, Florida (IATA airport code)
 PNVS – (i) Pilot Night Vision Sensor
 PNH
 (i) Paroxysmal nocturnal hemoglobinuria
 Police Nationale d'Haïti (French, "National Police of Haiti")

PO
 Po – (s) Polonium
 PO
 (s) Dust Devil (METAR Code)
 (i) per os (Latin, "by mouth")
 (s) Portugal (FIPS 10-4 country code)
 PO – (i) Post Office
 PO – (i) Purchase Order
 POCD – (i) Post-Operative Cognitive Dysfunction
 pod – (a) Plain Old Documentation
 POD
 (i) Payable on Death (banking term, and the full name of American metal band P.O.D.)
 Point of divergence (alternate or counterfactual history)
 Port of Debarkation
 POE – (a) Perl Object Environment – (b) Port Of Embarkation (c) Polyol Ester (d) Power Over Ethernet
 POETS – (a) Portable Occultation, Eclipse, and Transit electronic-camera System
 POFF – (a) Plain Old Flat File
 POG – (a) Passionfruit, Orange and Guava
 POGO – (a) Project On Government Oversight
 POI – (i) Program Of Instruction
 POK – (a/i) Plane Of Knowledge
 pol – (s) Polish language (ISO 639-2 code)
 POL
 (i) Petroleum, Oils and Lubricants
 (s) Poland (ISO 3166 trigram)
 POLAD – (p) Political Advice
 POM
 (i) Program Objective Memorandum
 PolyOxyMethylene
 POMDP – (i) Partially observable Markov decision process
 POP
 (a/i) Point of Presence
 Post Office Protocol
 Progesterone Only Pill
 por – (s) Portuguese language (ISO 639-2 code)
 POR
 (s) Portugal (FIFA and IOC trigram, but not ISO 3166)
 (i) Proposed Operational Requirement
 POS
 (a/i) Point Of Sale terminal (retail industry transaction computers)
 (i) Piece Of S**t
 POSH – (a) Port Outbound Starboard Home (alleged)
 POTC o PotC – (a) Pirates of the Caribbean
 POSSLQ – Person of the Opposite Sex Sharing Living Quarters
 POT – (a/i) Plane Of Tranquility
 POTS
 (a) Plain Old Telephone Service (cf. PANS)
 Postural orthostatic tachycardia syndrome
 POV – (i) Point of view
 POW – (i) Prisoner of war

PP
 pp
 pages, especially in references, e.g. "A. U. Thor, Title, Journal X, Vol. 1, no. 2 (2010) pp. 13-42."
 PP
 (s) Papua New Guinea (FIPS 10-4 country code)
 (i) Passage Point
 per procurationem (Latin, "by proxy")
 PPA
 (i) Parahippocampal Place Area
 PolyPhthalAmide
 PPASC – (i) (U.S.) Plans and Program Analysis Support Center
 PPASSCCATAG - (a) "Proud Parents Against Singles, Seniors, Childless Couples And Teens And Gays", a fictional group formed by Marge Simpson
 PPCLI – (i) Princess Patricia's Canadian Light Infantry (regiment)
 PPG
 (i) Pittsburgh Plate Glass (the original name of the company now known as PPG Industries)
 The Powerpuff Girls
 PPL
 (i) Pakistan Petroleum Limited
 Pay per lead (marketing)
 Pennsylvania Power & Light, former name of the U.S. utility company now known as PPL
 Pfadfinder und Pfadfinderinnen Liechtensteins (German, "Scouts and Guides of Liechtenstein")
 Phonographic Performance Limited (UK performing rights organisation)
 PPLI – (i) Precise Participant Location & Identification
 ppm – (i) Parts Per Million
 PPM – (i) Parts Per Million
 PPM – (i) Project Planning and Management
 PPO – (i) PolyPhenylene Oxide
 PPP
 (i) Point-to-Point Protocol
 Purchasing Power Parity
 PPQ – (i) Pulses Per Quarter (used in music programming, sequencers)
 PPQN – (i) Pulses Per Quarter Note (ditto)
 PPQT – (i) Pre-Production Qualification Test
 PPS
 (i) post postscriptum
 Precise/Precision Positioning Service (GPS)
 PolyPhenylene Sulfide
 PPV – (a) Pay-per-view

PQ
 PQ
 (s) Province of Québec (obsolete postal code, replaced by QC)
 (i) Parti Québécois

PR
 Pr – (i) Pastor or Priest
 Pr – (s) Praseodymium
 PR
 (i) Public Relations
 (s) Puerto Rico (postal symbol; ISO 3166 digram)
 Prb – (i) Presbyter
 PRBO – (i) Point Reyes Bird Observatory
 PRC – (i) People's Republic of China
 PRD – (i) CERDEC Product Realization Directorate
 PRFG – (s) Partial Fog (METAR Code)
 PRI – (s) Puerto Rico (ISO 3166 trigram)
 Prinair - Puerto Rico International Airlines
 PRK – (s) Democratic People's Republic of Korea (ISO 3166 trigram)
 PRM – (i) Personnel Readiness Management
 PRN – (i) pro re nata (Latin, "for the emergency", "as needed")
 PRT
 (s) Portugal (ISO 3166 trigram)
 (i) Provincial Reconstruction Team
 PRY – (s) Paraguay (ISO 3166 trigram)

PS
 ps
 (s) Pashto language (ISO 639-1 code)
 picosecond
 pS – (s) picosiemens
 Ps – (s) petasecond
 PS
 (s) Palestinian Territory, Occupied (ISO 3166 digram)
 (i) Personnel Services
 (s) petasiemens
 (i) post scriptum (Latin, "written after")
 Power Steering
 Power Supply
 Public School
 PooS – Poo Sniffer (Internet shorthand)
 PSA
 (i) Paralysis Society of America
 Pharmaceutical Society of Australia
 Pressure-Sensitive Adhesive
 Production Services Association
 Prostate Specific Antigen
 Public Service Announcement
 Public Service Association
 PSC
 (i) Personal service corporation
 Primary Somatosensory Cortex
 PSE – (s) Palestinian Territory, Occupied (ISO 3166 trigram)
 PSG
 (i) Pacific Seabird Group
 Paris Saint-Germain
 PSI - (i) Pounds per square inch
 PSI – (a/i) Portable Source Initiative
 PSO
 (i) Peace Support Operations
 Primary Standardisation Office (ABCA)
 Protocol Supporting Organization (of the ICANN)
 PSS – (i) Personnel System Support
 PST – (i) Pacific Standard Time (UTC−8 hours)
 PSU – (i) Pennsylvania State University
 PSV
 (i) Philips Sport Vereniging (Dutch for "Philips Sports Union")
 Public Service Vehicle
 PsyOp – (p) Psychological Operations

PT
 pt – (s) Portuguese language (ISO 639-1 code)
 pT – (s) picotesla
 Pt – (s) Platinum
 PT – (s) petatesla – (i) Physical Training (in the Army) – (s) Portugal (ISO 3166 digram)
 PTA – (i) Parent-Teacher Association
 PTAL – (i) Public Transport Accessibility Level
 PTAN – 
 (i) Precision Terrain Aided Navigation
 (a) (pronounced P-tan) Provider Transaction Access Number
 PTCAS - Physical Therapy Centralized Application System
 PTES - (i) People's Trust for Endangered Species
 PTFE – (i) PolyTetraFluoroEthylene
 PTI – (i) Pardon the Interruption
 PTL – (p) Patrol – (i) Primary Target Line
 PTO – (i) Patent and Trademark Office – Please Turn Over
 PTSD – (i) Posttraumatic stress disorder
 PTUI – (a/i) Plain-Text User Interface ("pa-too-ey") (cf CLI)

PU
 Pu – (s) Plutonium
 PU
 (s) Guinea-Bissau (FIPS 10-4 country code)
 (i) Polyurethane
 (s) United States Miscellaneous Pacific Islands (ISO 3166 digram; obsolete 1986)
 Pub – (p) Publication
 PUG – (a/i) PET Users Group
 PUN – (a/i) Pull-Up Network
 PUP – (a/i) Pull-Up Point
 PUR – (s) Puerto Rico (IOC and FIFA trigram, but not ISO 3166)
 pus – (s) Pashto language (ISO 639-2 code)
 PUS – (s) United States Miscellaneous Pacific Islands (ISO 3166 trigram; obsolete 1986)

PV
 pV – (s) picovolt
 PV – (s) petavolt
 PVC
 (i) Permanent Virtual Circuit
 PolyVinyl Chloride
 Premature Ventricular Contraction
 Primary Visual Cortex
 PvE – (i) Player versus Environment
 PvP – (i) Player versus Player
 PVR – (i) Personal Video Recorder
 PvZ – (i) Plants vs. Zombies

PW
 pW – (s) picowatt
 PW
 (s) Palau (postal symbol; ISO 3166 digram)
 petawatt
 PWA – (i) Pirates With Attitude
 PWBA – (p) Pension and Welfare Benefits Administration
 PwC – (i) PricewaterhouseCoopers (international accounting firm)
 PWC – (i) PieceWise Constant (describing a mathematical function)
 PWL – (i) PieceWise Linear (describing a mathematical function)
 PWLC – (i) PieceWise Linear and Concave/Convex (describing a mathematical function)
 PWM - (i) Pulse-width Modulation
 PWP – (i) Plot, What Plot? / Porn Without Plot (denotes plotless, um, "feel-good" stories in online fiction, especially fanfic or erotic fiction)
 PWR – (i) Pressurized Water Reactor
 PWV – (i) Pretoria-Witwatersrand-Vereeniging, the original name for the South African province now known as Gauteng, and still used to refer to the metropolitan agglomeration at the core of the province

PX
 PX – (p) Post eXchange

PY
 PY – (s) Paraguay (ISO 3166 digram) – Person-Year – (i) Portsmouth yardstick
 PYF – (s) French Polynesia (ISO 3166 trigram)
 PYG – (s) Paraguayan guaraní (ISO 4217 currency code)
 PYMWYMI – (a) Put Your Money Where Your Mouth Is

PZ
 PZ – (s) Panama Canal Zone (ISO 3166 digram; obsolete 1980) – (i) Pickup Zone

References

Acronyms P